The UP Fighting Maroons are the collegiate varsity teams of the University of the Philippines, primarily off Diliman, which play in the University Athletic Association of the Philippines (UAAP), the premiere sports league in the country.

The Fighting Maroons moniker, though, is more commonly used to refer to the men's basketball team (see Team monikers below).

History
UAAP Founding Member
UP is one of the founding members (1938) of the UAAP. It was also a founding member and the originator of the National Collegiate Athletic Association (NCAA) in the year 1924.

UP was a perennial contender for the overall championship in the UAAP. The team last won the UAAP Seniors (now referred to as Collegiate) Overall Championship in the 1997–1998 season, two years before the University last hosted the competitions prior to its centennial.

The UAAP has eight member-universities and holds tournaments in 14 sports (17 sports disciplines). Only four of the eight member-universities participate in all of the fifteen sports; UP is one of these four.

Team identity

Team monikers
Prior to the establishment of the NCAA in 1924, the sports press have been referring to the collegiate teams by the color of their uniforms. School varsity teams were called the Blue and Whites, the Red and Whites, the Green and Whites and in the case of UP, the Maroon and Greens. In the late 1930s, schools started to adopt mascots and the sports press would now refer to their varsity teams by the name of their mascots. Sportswriters wrote about the games played by the Blue Eagles, the Green Archers, the Red Lions in their sports articles for their news dailies. In the case of UP, the varsity team was called the UP Parrots when the school adopted the parrot as its mascot. Sometime in the 1990s, the moniker UP Parrots was changed to UP Fighting Maroons when the parrot was dropped as the team mascot. The new moniker revived the old (vintage 1920s) name Maroons, and the adjective "fighting" was added to describe the kind of spirit that the varsity teams of UP have when they participate in the arena of competitive sports.

Aside from Fighting Maroons, which is applicable for all teams, there are other official varsity team names that exist, which are sourced from the school's official student publications. They are as follows:
(Note that either UP/UPIS is appended before the team names for the case of the collegiate and high school teams, respectively.)

Note, however, that such student publications are starting to use Fighting Maroons for all teams and just specify the team thus referred to in the lede or in the first mention.

Other varsity teams:
 Pep Squad
 Filipiniana Dance Troupe
 UP Streetdance Club

Team logo 

Prior to July 2015, there is no official logo for the UP Fighting Maroons, thus the University Seal is used in uniforms of the university's student-athletes. UP System registered trademarks such as the Oblation and sometimes the university seal were used to represent the university's varsity team in UAAP broadcasts. A new logo representing the varsity team had to be designed after UP College of Human Kinetics Dean Ronnie Dizer told ABS-CBN Sports, the official broadcaster of the UAAP, that the Oblation logo is no longer allowed in UAAP coverage.

On July 20, 2015, a set of six logos were released by the University of the Philippines. The new main logo uses a clenched left fist as a primary symbol with the teams initials UMP. The logo according to the university highlights the "institution’s unique history and tradition – catalysts for change and defenders of the people.” The letter "M" is incorporated at the bottom part of the fist. The M design of the main logo is named the "M Cut". A partial version of the logo which composes only of the fist with the M Cut of the main logo may be used where the name of the team or the university is not required to be shown.

In addition, an internal, secondary, and tertiary logos were also revealed. The internal logo is in shape of the Oblation, the secondary logo is a geometric shapes arranged in a form of a fist, and the tertiary logo composes of a man and a woman raising and clenching one of their fists, named Isko & Iska. The later two logos, the secondary and tertiary are used for marketing and promotional purposes.

The proposal for the new brand identity was initiated by Mandy Reyes and Pete Jimenez of Nowhere to Go but UP, an alumni organization. The design team is composed of the following: Dan Matutina (along with Bernice de Leon-Yumul, Joanna Malinis, and Raxenne Maniquiz of Plus63 Design Co.), Kay Aranzanso, Ralph Guibani, and AJ Dimarucot.

June 20, 2015, leaked proposal

Prior to the July release of the new logos, one of the proposals for a new logo for the UP Fighting Maroons were unofficially released on June 15. The logo released on June 15 features a warrior holding a shield with the inscription "UP" in baybayin on his left hands aiming to throw a spear with his right hand.

UP alumnus and Supreme Court Spokesman Atty. Theodore Te, criticized the logo and remarked that "There is a reason why there is an Oblation in every UP campus. And so many clenched fists too. That is the spirit behind the oblation: service and sacrifice; the giving of self. It is the same spirit that moves every UP student and alum to raise a fist or offer a hand and not see any contradiction." Jojo Robles of The Standard another UP alumnus, agreed with Te's comments and implied that the logo violated trademark of a vinegar manufacturer which he didn't name and called on the manufacturer to sue the designers. The new logo was negatively received by UP netizens.

The university clarified that the logo is still to be revised and the final version of the logo was released a month later on June 20, 2015.

Championships
The following table shows the number of championships in the UAAP (and also the NCAA). It can be noted that UP has titles in all but two (beach volleyball and 3x3) of the disciplines in the UAAP program and the University boasts of successful swimming and athletics programs, with 34 and 24 titles apiece in the league (37 for swimming and 30 for athletics, if one includes NCAA). UP also holds the most titles in badminton (14) in the UAAP.

UAAP

Note: Poomsae is a coed event. Most number of championships in each division is in italics.

NCAA

Also has six uncategorized team titles in athletics.

Legend:
 Dashes (–) mean no team.
 Black boxes mean no championships were awarded in this event and division. In the case of NCAA, no titles were awarded in the entire time UP was part of the said league.

Streaks

 Current/Active Championship Streak(s):
 Men's Athletics - 2 (2018–19, 2022–23) 

 Longest Championship Streak(s) (4 years and over):

Women's Badminton – 6 (1995–2000) (UR) 
Men's Athletics – 5 (1963–1967) and (1975–1979)
Women's Swimming – 5 (2009–2013)
Men's Swimming – 5 (2003–2007) 
Women's Fencing – 5 (2000–2004)
Baseball – 5 (1977–1981) (UR)  
Men's Football – 5 (1973–1977)  

Boys' Athletics – 4 (2010–2013)
Women's Basketball – 4 (1980–1983) (UR)
Men's Badminton – 4 (1997–2000)
Women's Judo – 4 (1999–2002 and 2006–2009)
Women's Table Tennis – 4 (1997–2000) 
Men's Volleyball – 4 (1977–1980) 

First of the streak is from UAAP Season 81 (2018–2019)
First of the streak is from UAAP Season 84 (2021–2022). The season was played in 2022.
(UR) means UAAP Record.
The team has another streak from 1996–1999 (4).
Includes 1 co-championship (1977 with FEU).
Includes 2 co-championships (both with UST).

Double championships
A double crown is achieved when the collegiate (Men's and Women's) and high school (Boys' and Girls') squads win the championship of the same sport in the same year in the UAAP.

 Collegiate:
 Badminton: 4 (consecutive: 1997–98, 1998–99, 1999–2000, 2000–01)
 Swimming: 4 (1993–94, 1997–1998, 2010–2011, 2013–2014)
 Judo: 3 (consecutive: 1995–96 and 1996–1997, 2007–08)
 Volleyball: 2 (1977–78, 1979–80)
 Football: 1 (2015–2016)
 Baseball/Softball: 1 (2001–2002)
 Table Tennis: 1 (1998–1999)

These are "double crowns" of a different nature.

 Men's & Boys'
 Basketball: 2 (NCAA: 1925–26 and 1926–27)
 Men's & Girls'
 Swimming: 2 (2006–07 and 2007–08)

Rankings history
The following tables show the rankings history of the teams in the UAAP.

Seniors Division
 Gold border denotes overall championship season.

Fencing and Women's Tennis were demonstration sports in 1996–97, and is not included in the calculation of points for the overall championship.
This placing is due to forfeiture of La Salle games. See UAAP Season 68 for details.
Beach volleyball was a demonstration sport in 2006–07, and is not included in the calculation of points for the overall championship.

Juniors Division

Team sports

Basketball
UP Fighting Maroons Season 84 Championship Team

UP Fighting Maroons current recruits

Notable players
 Fort Acuña
 Bright Akhuetie
 Eric Altamirano
 Bryan Gahol
 Ryan Gregorio
 Yeng Guiao
 Nic Jorge
 Poch Juinio
 Joe Lipa
 Ronnie Magsanoc
 Paolo Mendoza
 Andre Paras
 Benjie Paras
 Paul Desiderio
 Kobe Paras
 Bo Perasol
 Ricci Rivero

Volleyball

Notable players
 Kathy Bersola
 Tots Carlos
 Lino Cayetano
 Pia Cayetano
 Ayel Estrañero
 Isa Molde
 Jed Montero
 Nicole Tiamzon
 Kiko Pangilinan

Beach volleyball
The school has men's and women's beach volleyball teams.

See also
University Athletic Association of the Philippines (UAAP)
UAAP Cheerdance Competition
UP–UST rivalry

References

External links
 UP Athletics Web Portal
 UP Fighting Maroons Web Site

University of the Philippines Diliman Fighting Maroons
College sports teams in Metro Manila
Shakey's V-League
Spikers' Turf
Former National Collegiate Athletic Association (Philippines) teams

fr:UP Marrons Combattants